The 2018–19 Saint Mary's Gaels women's basketball team represents Saint Mary's College of California in the 2018–19 NCAA Division I women's basketball season. The Gales, led by thirteenth year head coach Paul Thomas, play their home games at the McKeon Pavilion and were members of the West Coast Conference. They finished the season 21–12, 12–6 in WCC play to finish in fourth place. They advanced to the semifinals of the WCC women's tournament where they lost to Gonzaga. They received an at-large bid to the Women's National Invitation Tournament where defeated Hawaii in the first round before losing to WCC member Pepperdine in the second round.

Roster

Schedule and results

|-
!colspan=9 style=| Non-conference regular season

|-
!colspan=9 style=| WCC regular season

|-
!colspan=9 style=| WCC Women's Tournament

|-
!colspan=9 style=| WNIT

See also
 2018–19 Saint Mary's Gaels men's basketball team

References

Saint Mary's Gaels women's basketball seasons
Saint Mary's
Saint Mary's
Saint Mary's
Saint Mary's